The Abbots Ripton rail disaster occurred on 21 January 1876 at Abbots Ripton, then in the county of Huntingdonshire, England, on the Great Northern Railway main line, previously thought to be exemplary for railway safety. In the accident, the Special Scotch Express train from Edinburgh to London was involved in a collision, during a blizzard, with a coal train. An express travelling in the other direction then ran into the wreckage. The initial accident was caused by:
 over-reliance on signals and block working as allowing high-speed running even in adverse conditions
 systematic signal failure in the adverse conditions of that day due to a vulnerability to accumulation of snow and ice

The accident (and the subsequent inquiry into it) led to fundamental changes in British railway signalling practice.

Overview

A coal train preceding the Flying Scotsman on the main East Coast up (south-bound) line was normally scheduled to be shunted into a siding at Abbots Ripton to allow the much faster Flying Scotsman to pass.  Because of a very bad snowstorm, both the coal train and the Flying Scotsman were running late and the signalman at Holme, the next station north of Abbots Ripton, judged that the coal train needed to go into sidings at Holme if it was not to delay the Flying Scotsman. He therefore set his signal levers to danger so as to stop the coal train, but it continued on the main line until it reached Abbots Ripton, where as expected the signalman waved it on to his box with a hand lamp, and directed it to shunt. The goods train had nearly completed shunting into the Abbots Ripton siding when the Scotch express ran into it at speed. The wreckage obstructed the down (northbound) line and a second collision occurred some minutes later when a northbound express to Leeds crashed into the wreckage. Thirteen passengers died in the collisions, and 53 passengers and 6 traincrew members were injured.

The Great Northern was operating on the block system, which was supposed to eliminate such accidents, so the accident caused considerable alarm. It was soon established that the main problem was with signals and snow:
 the weight of snow on the semaphore arm and/or snow and ice on the wires by which the arm should be moved had meant that when signalmen had put levers to the 'danger' position from the normal 'all clear' the signals did not fully move to 'danger'
 in normal conditions, signalmen could see the signals they were controlling – in a snowstorm they could not
The coal train had therefore seen nothing to make it stop at Holme, and the Flying Scotsman whilst catching up with it had run through a number of signals which were showing 'clear' although their levers had been set to 'danger'.

Narrative

Great Northern Railway equipment and practices

Geography
North of Peterborough passenger and coal traffic took different routes. After the fast train had passed, the slow train would resume its journey.

Block working
Traffic along the line was regulated by block working.  Abbots Ripton and Holme had signal boxes and between them were two intermediate boxes. All controlled 'home' signals near the box and 'distant' signals about half a mile (c 800m) before the home signals. The line was thus divided into three blocks, each roughly 2 miles (c 3.1 km) long; entry to each block was controlled by the signal box at the start of the block. Shunting into the siding at Abbots Ripton took place in a fourth block. The 'home' signals at Abbots Ripton were interlocked with the siding points, so that whenever the points were open to the main line the Abbots Ripton home signal lever had to be at 'danger'.

All boxes could communicate with adjacent boxes by their block telegraph. Signals were normally kept at 'all clear' but were set to 'danger' to protect trains as follows.  When a train entered a block by passing a home signal, the signalman would set the home signal to 'danger', thus preventing a following train entering the same block. The distant would also be set to 'danger'.  Trains were required to stop at a home signal at 'danger', but were allowed to pass a distant signal at 'danger' as this merely warned an approaching driver to moderate his speed to be ready to stop the train at the home signal.  Both signals would be returned to 'all clear' when the next box telegraphed 'line clear'. Normally, as soon as a train was past a box's home signal, the signalman would telegraph 'line clear' to the preceding box. During foggy or snowy weather, however, when a train stopped at a station 'line clear' was not sent until the train had restarted, or been shunted into a siding. In good weather therefore a goods train being shunted into a siding at Abbots Ripton should have been protected against another train running into it by the Abbots Ripton 'home' and 'distant' signals ; in falling snow, the home and distant signals of the previous box should have given further protection and the fast train should always have been at least one full block away.

Signal boxes serving stations/sidings had, as well as the block telegraph, 'speaking telegraph' instruments.  These were not telephones, but Morse code senders, used for messages (for example how late a train was running).

Signals
The signals used on the Great Northern to work the block system were lower quadrant semaphores. A lever in the signal box was connected by a wire (under tension, and passing over intermediate pulleys) to a counterweighted arm on the signal.  To set a signal to all clear, the signalman pulled the appropriate lever in his signal box; this moved the arm down (which was pivoted in a slot in the signal post), against the pull of the counterweight, "to a vertical position in the post". When the lever was moved to set the signal to danger, this did not positively drive the signal to “danger” but paid out slack in the wire and allowed the counterweight to take the arm to a horizontal position.  

Since by day the signal arms were clearly visible from the signal box from which they were worked, the system had no repeater in the signal box to confirm a signal was actually showing the aspect corresponding to the lever position.

In emergency the signal could be set to ‘danger’ by cutting the wire; but a heavy weight lying on the wire would keep the signal at ‘all clear’ by effectively pulling on it: since the signals were normally set to ‘all clear’ any fault which stopped them being moved would almost certainly keep them at ‘all clear’ as well.

At night (or in poor visibility in daytime) an oil lamp displayed a white light when the signal was at 'all clear'; when the signal arm moved to the horizontal “danger” position it brought a red lens in front of the light, so that a red light was then displayed to oncoming trains. In poor visibility, GNR regulations called for detonators to be laid if possible on the track at the home signal when this was set to danger; at stations where platelayers were available, this should also be done at the distant signals.

Brakes
The express trains were made up of non-bogie non-corridor four- or six-wheel carriages. There were 13 on the Leeds express, giving a weight (including the engine and tender) of somewhat over 200 tons. At this period, other railways often had to resort to using more than one engine to maintain a high top speed; the Great Northern (favoured with one of the best engine classes of the period – the Stirling 8-foot singles) prided itself on not doing so. As with all the other railways, though, it had considerable difficulties in stopping the trains rapidly once they were at speed. To stop a train, the driver could shut off steam, get his fireman to apply a handbrake on the tender and put the engine into reverse. He had no means of applying brakes to the rest of the train; indeed most of the carriages had no brakes.  Two or three of the carriages were brake carriages with handbrakes, each with a guard who would apply them when (and if) he heard the driver "whistle for brakes". In trials carried out after the accident under favourable conditions this was shown to bring the train to rest within 800–1150 yards when travelling at 40–45 mph.  The Railway Inspectors considered that much shorter stopping distances would be possible if passenger trains were provided with continuous brakes operable by the driver, and had urged such systems be fitted. This had been resisted by the railway companies as unnecessary, unreliable, expensive and dangerous.

Flying Scotsman
On the night of the accident, the Scotch express had 10 passenger carriages.  These were first- or second-class; as customary the train did not carry third-class passengers.  Notable passengers included the Russian Ambassador, the deputy chairman and another director of the Great Northern, and a director (John Cleghorn, formerly company secretary) and the chief engineer (Thomas Elliot Harrison, a past president of the Institution of Civil Engineers) of the North Eastern Railway. At the inquest, the coroner's summing up noted that it was a heavy responsibility to stop a train, but did not explicitly suggest the prestige of the Scotch express aggravated the responsibility.

The first collision
On the afternoon of 21 January, the Peterborough-Huntingdon area was experiencing a very bad snow storm; more than one witness at the Inquiry said they had never known worse: "freezing blowing and snowing .. bad for seeing signals". Crucially, the snow/sleet fell onto already cold ground and equipment, freezing on them.

The southbound coal train had left Peterborough about 18 minutes late, and therefore with about 12 minutes less lead on the Flying Scotsman than normal. It progressed steadily to Abbots Ripton where it stopped by the signalbox (at about 6.41) and on the instructions of the Abbots Ripton signalman began to shunt into the siding, as normal, to let the Flying Scotsman overtake. The signalman urged the driver to hurry up, as he was "keeping the Scotchman standing at Wood Walton (the previous signal box)".

The signalman at Holme had been concerned that, because the coal train was so late, if it went on to Abbots Ripton before shunting into a siding the Flying Scotsman would be delayed. To avoid this, he had decided to stop the train at Holme and put it into a siding there. He set his signal levers to put his signals to danger, but when the coal train arrived at Holme at 6.21 pm it did not stop. He telegraphed to Abbots Ripton that the train had run past the signals, and told the stationmaster at Holme that the train had disobeyed the signals. As the Inquiry report noted "The evidence as to what then happened at the Holme station was unsatisfactorily given, and is not clear"

The Holme station master told the enquiry that he then sent for the platelayers; whilst waiting for them he checked the up line home signal and saw it to be at 'danger'. However, when a down express went through he noticed that one of the signals did not go to 'danger' after it had passed. This appeared considerably at variance with other testimony.

The platelayers had to be sent for because they had been allowed to go home at the end of their normal working day, despite the weather. Their foreman was uneasy about this and came out of his house to watch the up distant signal whilst two trains went past: the first of these was the Manchester express, running about 13 minutes behind the Scotsman; the second a slow stopping passenger train, a further 6 minutes behind when it left Peterborough.  As he feared, the signal showed a white light throughout.  He put his work clothes back on and went to the signal.  The arm was weighed down with snow; once he had shaken this off by working the arm up and down it showed a red light. He then walked to the station; on his way he met a platelayer despatched to the distant signal by the stationmaster.

Other witnesses also gave evidence strongly suggesting that the platelayers were not summoned until after the Scotsman had passed and were not back at work until after the Manchester express had passed (c 6.50.). They reported that other signals (including the up home signal) were – when first checked – in the same state as the up distant. The signalman also claimed that the stationmaster had reported the up home signal to not be working properly.

The Scotch express had left Peterborough at 6.24, about 6 minutes late. It did not slacken speed for the bad weather; it passed through Holme at about 6.37, the signals all showing clear, and arrived at Wood Walton at 6.40. The signalman there had set his signal levers to put his signals to 'danger' to protect the shunting at Abbots Ripton, but had not left his levers to set detonators at the home signal, nor did he supplement his fixed signals by displaying a hand-lamp from the signal box.  He told the inquiry he was busy stopping a train of empty coal wagons on the down line, and because of the weather he did not hear the express until it ran past his cabin at full speed. At 6.44 the Scotsman reached Abbots Ripton, its driver having seen "nothing but white lights all the way from Peterboro".  It was at full speed (40–45 mph) when it crashed into the coal train, which had not yet cleared the main line. Some coal wagons were smashed, but the coal train engine itself was largely unscathed. The express engine derailed and veered to the right.  It ended up lying on its side, beyond the down line. Behind it, its tender and two passenger carriages were obstructing the down line.

The second collision
The railway workers involved were badly shaken – some admitted it took them a few minutes to fully gather their wits but the guards (whose duty it was to 'protect their train') were affected to a lesser extent. The guard of the express walked back up the up line towards Wood Walton, laying fog-signals (detonators) on the rails to warn any further trains to stop. Despite the signals showing 'all clear', the Manchester express stopped in response to the Wood Walton signalman using a hand-lamp to show a red light from his signal-box. It finally pulled up beyond the Wood Walton down distant signal; the Abbots Ripton up distant signal could be seen ahead showing the white “all clear”. It then proceeded cautiously towards Abbots Ripton, being stopped successively by the Scotsman guard waving a red hand-lamp and then by a platelayer, eventually drawing up at the rear of the wrecked Scotsman.

The fireman of the coal train similarly laid detonators on the down line just inside the Abbots Ripton down distant signal, and was then picked up by the coal train engine running light to Huntingdon to seek assistance and warn approaching down trains. This was at the instigation of a GNR “relief clerk” (i.e. a clerk qualified to act as a ‘’locum’’ stationmaster) who had been travelling on the express.

The Abbots Ripton signalman was evidently dazed by the events; he set his signals in both directions to 'danger' but did not (as he should also have done) immediately send the 5-beat 'obstruction danger' bell signal to Stukeley, the next signal box south.  Instead he tried to send a message reporting the crash and seeking assistance by the speaking telegraph to Huntingdon station to the south. He prefixed the message with the special 'SP' code indicating top priority but the signalman at Huntingdon did not answer. The Abbots Ripton signalman kept trying to raise Huntingdon, but without success; when the Huntingdon signalman did answer he first refused to accept any message not starting with a code to indicate time sent, and rebuffed subsequent sends with an 'MQ' code – roughly translating as "Go away, I'm busy". Indeed, he was; he was accepting the Leeds express and passing it on to the next signal box. At 6.52, after trying and failing for 8 minutes to pass his message to Huntingdon South, the Abbots Ripton signalman sent the 5-beat 'obstruction danger' bell signal to Stukeley.

The down Leeds express passed through Huntingdon at about 6.49 (at which time no message had been accepted from Abbots Ripton) and reached Stukeley at 6.52.  The signalman at Stukeley received the 'obstruction danger' message just seconds after the express had passed. The Abbots Ripton down distant signal was showing 'all clear' and the Leeds express approached it at full speed.
I found a white light at the distant signal at Abbotts Ripton. After passing that signal post, I was alarmed by passing over two fog-signals which exploded; I at once shut off steam and told my mate to put on the tender break .  I was then going at 40 or 50 miles an hour.  In another instant I met an engine on the up road giving sharp whistles, and saw a red lamp from it, which I took to mean that there was something out of the ordinary way. I reversed my engine, and reapplied my steam, and as soon as that was done the collision occurred Still travelling at some speed, the Leeds express ploughed through the tender and carriages blocking the line (this, rather than the first collision, is when most – if not all – of the deaths are thought to have occurred).

The Abbots Ripton signalman had just started his 12-hour shift at 6 p.m. His colleague on the day shift returned to work on hearing of the first collision, arriving soon after the second collision. He took over the speaking telegraph, because whilst the duty signalman appeared to be doing his best to send the message he was confused at the time, and I felt I was more able to send the message than he. Messages seeking assistance were then sent to Huntingdon and Peterborough.

Inquiry

A Court of Inquiry was convened, and took evidence from 24 January to 17 February, issuing its report on 23 February. The inquiry rejected the conclusion of the coroner's jury that the block system was at fault and "had proved ineffective in a case of emergency", riposting "such a conclusion, natural enough on a superficial view to those who are not thoroughly versed in the subject, really results from a confusion of ideas". The problem was with signals, and any system of working railways must be ineffective if signals could not be relied upon.

Findings

The immediate cause was the accumulation of snow on the semaphore arms and/or control wire of several sets of signals. On the night of the accident the weight of snow on some signal arms and wires meant that the arm balanced well short of the 'danger' position and that the spectacle plate failed to drop sufficiently to move a red lens in front of the white lamp displayed in the "all clear" position. The signal therefore showed a white light ("all clear") when the lever in the signal box was in fact set to danger; the snow and ice (in the words of the Inquiry Report) thus rendered the signals 
not only useless for warning by red-lights the engine-driver of the Scotch-express-train, but also a means by the exhibition of white lights of luring him forward at full speed to the collision.
The inquiry had heard evidence from experienced working-level witnesses that this (or a milder manifestation of this) was a known problem on snowy days but could easily be sorted if you knew how, e.g., by "jiggling the arms".  It implicitly rejected the evidence from GNR senior managers who denied that there was any prior history of problems, but made no comment on the discrepancy.

Operating practice at that time was that the signals were left in the 'clear' position continuously unless protecting a static obstruction. Consequently, the signals stood at clear for considerable periods of time, and there was little opportunity to spot the problem.

The inquiry report noted various suggested improvements to signal arrangements, but cautioned against over-elaborate solutions:
It is well that these and other proposals for improvement, which are constantly invented or advocated, such as combining sight with sound at the signals, and the use of detonators, mechanically applied, to supersede the use of fogmen, should receive full consideration and discussion, after the experience of so terrible an accident, caused mainly by the failure of existing signal-arrangements.  But, in the course of such deliberations, the facts must not be lost sight of, that men are still liable to make mistakes, machinery is still liable to fail, and further complication is by no means certain in all cases to produce greater safety.
It commented adversely on the performance of individuals:
 "The want of judgement or precaution exhibited by the station-master at Holme" for not stopping the Scotsman and warning its driver of the signal problem
 "The neglect of the Wood Walton signalman" in not putting detonators down or exhibiting a red handlamp to the Scotsman
 "The delay of the signalman at the Huntingdon South" signal box in answering Abbots Ripton

and, without blaming individuals, on

the delay in warning Stukeley of the obstruction on the down line
the failure to put platelayers at signals as soon as they were needed; to clear the signals of snow or to lay down detonators if the signals could not be made to work
 “the running of fast through trains at full speed through such a storm .. without the adoption of extra precautions, such as the detention of slower trains, the use of hand-lamps in the signal-cabins, and the employment of platelayers at the signals”
the absence of a speaking telegraph in the intermediate signal boxes
the lack of continuous brakes on the Leeds express.

Recommendations

The Board of Trade had no regulatory powers to enforce the recommendations of the inquiry report.  The most important were:

 Improving signals so that they work properly in frost and snow, and that they provide an indication to the signalman if they are not operating properly
 Keeping the signals normally at danger, so that if they stick there is unlikely to be a false 'clear'
 The use by signalmen of hand lamps in bad weather to confirm the indications of fixed signals
 The provision of telegraph apparatus in all signal boxes
 The improvement of braking systems on trains
 The suspension of less important trains, and the reduction in speed of other trains, in very severe weather conditions.

Consequences

 The GNR adopted a significantly different design of semaphore signal; the 'somersault' signal. In this, the pivot about which the arm moved was at the middle of the arm; other things being equal accumulation of snow should not significantly affect the balance of the arm
  The modern practice of the default position for signals being 'danger' was adopted
 Railway companies were required by law to make an annual return to the Board of Trade on what fraction of their passenger rolling stock was fitted with continuous brakes
Over a longer timescale, and after further accidents
 Continuous braking was fitted to passenger trains
  'All clear' was indicated by a green light (so that a broken red lens – or one out of position- no longer gave false reassurance)

Popular culture
The accident was the inspiration behind the story The Flying Kipper, in the Rev. W. Awdry's book Henry the Green Engine.

Notes and references
Notes

References

External links
 Board of Trade Report file (PDF)
 University of Kent Library, UK: Dion William Boucicault (1855–1876) and the Abbots Ripton Railway Disaster

Railway accidents in 1876
1876 in England
Transport in Huntingdonshire
Accidents and incidents involving Great Northern Railway (Great Britain)
Rail transport in Cambridgeshire
Railway accidents and incidents in Huntingdonshire
19th century in Huntingdonshire
Train collisions in England
1876 disasters in the United Kingdom